Hope is a Canadian punk rock band formed in 1992 based out of Riverview. The band consists of songwriter/guitarist/vocalist Dana. "Britney" Robertson, bassist Jamie "Jimmy" Oldfield, songwriter/guitarist/vocalist Marco "The Chief" Rocca, and drummer Tom "T-Bone" Antle.

History

Early Days (1992-1995) 

Hope was formed by Dana Goofball Robertson (formerly of The Monoxides) on vocals/guitars, and Jamie "Jimmy" Oldfield on bass/vocals in 1992 Riverview, New Brunswick. Robertson and Oldfield began writing lyrics together after finding common philosophical ground in punk music. Hope's first drummer was Chris Lewis (later of Skinkeeper, Mood Cadillac, Iron Giant, etc.). The band released their first demo, New Love, recorded by Derek "Big D" Robichaud (of The Monoxides). Jamie actually sang lead vocals on a good portion of the first demo, which is quite rare for the band; Dana has for the most part always been known as the vocalist. Chris Lewis parted ways with Hope to move on to other bands and they recruited Ken Kelley (of The Monoxides) to take on drumming duties on Emus Can Fly, their second official demo (1993). After Ken moved on from Hope, a drummer by the name of Luc Daigle joined the band in 1994, along with the addition of Pascal "Pak" Toussaint of Sour Grapes on second guitar (from 1995–1996). This would solidify the Hope lineup for quite a few years. Everythin' About Nuttin' was recorded and mixed by Duane "Doolang" Kelly and released in 1995. It is little known that Luv Your Mummy (1996) was partially recorded by Rick White (Eric's Trip, Elevator) at his home studio, including early versions of some of the songs that would later be re-recorded on Lupus Man, the rest being tracked once again by the mighty Doolang.

Lupus Man (1996) 
Come 1996, Hope had been a solid 3-piece for a few years, playing tons of live gigs around the city with countless local bands finding more success. Hope went into Ham & Cheese Studios at MacNaughton High School to record a great-sounding official EP with Doolang, adding Jeremy Crossman on second guitar solely for this release. This EP includes some of the earliest hits by the band including "Treasure Girl", "Renovations" and "Summertime", which was the band's official single. A music video was also filmed and edited for the song and submitted to Much Music. The video for "Summertime" saw some decent rotation on MuchEast and was an introduction to the band for a lot of Monctonians. The EP is of course of out print but can rarely be found at Spin It or Livewire in Moncton.

The Chief, State of Halitosis & INMFYU (1997-2000) 
In January 1997, Marco "The Chief" Rocca (of The Disowned) joined Hope as lead guitarist and backup vocalist. After several jams, it was clear Marco would have some of his own songs to bring to the table and the band would function on a co-lead vocalist/background vocalist basis. The band itself had a new tight and solid feel. Refreshed and energized, they went into Ham & Cheese Studios with Doolang armed with an onslaught of new songs, and recorded one of their most solid efforts to date: their first official full-length CD, State of Halitosis. The album was released independently on Dana's Say 10 Records and spawned their huge hit "Carolyn Manson", for which a video was filmed, receiving marginal success nationwide due to airplay on MuchEast. This song would become a staple for the band in the years to come. Hope would continue playing shows around Moncton and the surrounding area, including trips to Halifax and Sackville.

At some point in 1999, Luc Daigle (drums) ended up being replaced due to musical differences. The band jammed with a couple of drummers - Cam Murphy (of The Traits, The Peter Parkers, Ghostown Belle, Thee Requiems), who joined the band for one day, and Craig "Crud" McFadden (of Malicious Attempt and The McFaddens), also for a short period. The band eventually replaced Luc very temporarily with a Moncton guy named Dave (no one remembers his last name). Signed to Lameass Recordz-based out of Calgary, in 2000 Hope would go on to record their sophomore release "It's Not My Fault You're Ugly", again recorded by Doolang at Ham & Cheese Studios. The album was distributed nationwide and was very well received. Dave was removed from the band shortly after the recording of INMFYU and replaced with the superior Tom "T-Bone" Antle (of Orchid and Fermeller) behind the kit, finalizing the band's revolving door of multiple drummers throughout their history. At this point, the band embarked on their first coast-to-coast, nationwide tour. Tom had prior obligations with university at the time, which led to the band tapping Johnny Horseface (of The Carmines and Dean Malenkos) to man the kit solely for the tour.

T-Bone, Feeling Like A Buck Fifty & Warped Tour (1999-2001)
The band went into Creative Sound Studios again with Doolang in 2001. Drums, guitars, and some vocals were recorded, at which point a halt was put to the session. After a short break, the band went into Reality Based/Cabin Studios with Kyle "MEN" McDonald to finish up on the recording of the album. Bass, lead guitars, and lead/backing vocals were completed and the album was mixed and mastered in 2001 by Kyle. The album was pressed, released, and distributed across Canada and the U.S. via Lameass Recordz and the band secured a spot on the Punkrock.net stage at Warped Tour 2002.

Lame-SASS, Do You Smell Gas & INMFYU Re-Recordings (2002-2004) 
The band ditched label Lameass Recordz due to poor business decisions by the label, which - not surprisingly - folded shortly thereafter. With a solid period of off-time back in Moncton, they decided to re-record their album INMFYU with Kyle at Reality Based Studios. The difference was the much better T-Bone manning the drums, not to mention that several of the songs had gone through structure changes, new vocal parts and harmonies, guitar leads, etc. Along with the album in full (minus the song "Who Farted??"), they laid down a couple of re-worked versions of older songs and rarities as well as a cover of "Bonzo" by the Ramones. These re-recordings (minus the re-recorded version of "Meathead" and a demo of a new song titled "haiHaiHAI!") were released in full exclusively via their website in mp3 format and stayed there for an extended period of time. A few weeks afterwards, the band went to Halifax to record with Laurence Currie along with the Dean Malenkos for a split EP on Southern California label Aggravated Music entitled Do You Smell Gas?. For this release, Hope recorded two new songs, "Suck Factory" and "Almost Like", and covered the Malenkos' song "Jon's Gone Straightedge". Meanwhile, the Malenkos recorded two new songs and covered the Hope song "Raelienation".

HOPE S/T & Milk & Cookies (2005-2007) 
Hope tapped Dean Malenkos drummer, Horseface, to produce their latest full-length album, which boasts 11 meaty tracks that are truly indicative of the band's sheer power. From the pumping "Mental Morphine" to the spastic "I Don’t Want To Change The World," Hope is headed in a single direction…straight to the top. Hope recorded its new self-titled album in Halifax with award-winning producer Laurence Currie (Sloan, The Gandharvas). Most of the album itself was recorded by Craig Sperry, who also recorded and mixed the upcoming debut album by The Nuclear. The band toured extensively through 2005-2007, opened for NOFX in Halifax 2006 and played three shows at Warped Tour 2007. Just prior to heading out for Warped Tour, Dana, Kyle and Don collaborated to put together a Hope rarities album entitled Nevermind The Monoxides, Here's Hope! The limited edition of only 100 copies includes some of the most sought after rare tracks by the band.

Split 7", Live Album and Future Demos (2007-present) 
HOPE Live Album Recording April 4, 2008, Poster by Sebas TheriaultHope recorded a new song entitled "Lungs Back" live at their jam spot,which was mixed to 2-track on the fly by Kyle, for their contribution to the Hope/Fear of Lipstick/The Damnsels/Sour Grapes Split 7" due sometime in 2008. A couple weeks afterwards on April 4, 2008, the band recorded their first live album at The Paramount Lounge with Kyle. The show featured acoustic opening acts by Denis of Secondsdown, Ilisha French of The Damnsels, Don Levandier & Nathan Jones of The Motorleague, and Pak Toussaint & Dana Robertson of The Payrents. The album is still in the mixing stages and is due at some point in 2008. Hope also have plans to demo tracks with Kyle in late 2008 for their next full-length album.

Members

Current 
Dana Robertson - Guitars and Vocals
Marco Rocca - guitar and vocals
Jamie Oldfield - bass
Tom "T-Bone" Antle - Drums

Former
Dave ? - drums (1999)
Cam Murphy - drums (one full day in 1999)
Jeremy Crossman - guitars (1996)
Luc Daigle - drums (1994–1999)
Pascal "Pak" Toussaint - guitar (1995–1996)
Ken Kelley - drums (1993)
Chris Lewis - drums (1992)

Discography

Demos 
New Love - 1992
Emus Can Fly - 1993
Everythin' About Nuttin' - 1995
Luv Yur Mummy - 1996

EPs 
Lupus Man - 1996
Do You Smell Gas (Dean Malenkos Split EP) - 2003

Full Length Albums 
State of Halitosis - 1998
It's Not My Fault You're Ugly - 2000
Feeling Like A Buck Fifty - 2002
Hope (2005)
Nevermind The Monoxides, Here's Hope! - 2007
Live at the Paramount - 2008

Other releases 
Hope/Fear of Lipstick/The Damnsels/Sour Grapes Split 7" (7" single) - *Sometime in 2008

Music videos 
Summertime
Carolyn Manson

See also 
List of bands from Canada

References

External links
Hope on CBC Radio 3
Hope on Myspace
http://www.canoe.ca/IndieBands/band1313.html
http://www.punknews.org/review/1027
https://web.archive.org/web/20071108061437/http://www.envoletmacadam.com/festival/artistes_fr.aspx?s=76&Id=176

Musical groups established in 1992
Musical groups from New Brunswick
Riverview, New Brunswick
Canadian punk rock groups
1992 establishments in New Brunswick
Musical groups from Moncton